Only For You - is a studio album of Sofia Rotaru, recorded at Melodiya in the USSR in 1979. This is one of the rare art works where her first name is spelled with an "h" as Sophia instead of typical Sofia.

Track listing

Languages of performance 

Songs are performed in Russian, Ukrainian and Romanian languages.

References

External links 

1979 albums
Sofia Rotaru albums